Shingo Futamura (April 3, 1938 -) is a rubber industry materials scientist noted for his concept of the deformation index.

Education 

Futamura completed his undergraduate Bachelor of Science degree at Waseda University in Japan.  He earned a masters degree from the University of Michigan in 1968.  He received his doctorate in polymer science from the University of Akron in 1975 under advisor Eberhard Meinecke.

Career 

By 1974, Futamura was appointed as a group leader of polymer physics at Firestone Central Research in Akron, Ohio. During a career spanning over 40 years, Futamura authored 25 scientific papers and 50 US patents. He worked for Nippon Zeon Co., Firestone Tire & Rubber Company, and Goodyear Tire & Rubber Company.

He is widely known for proposing the concept of a deformation index to relate viscoelastic properties to real-world tire performance. The concept is used to select rubber compounds that minimize tire rolling resistance, and it is used in finite element analysis to simplify the calculation of energy loss and temperature distribution.

Awards and recognition

 1973 - Honorable Mention award for paper entitled "Solution SBR-Study in Copolymerization Dynaimcs", ACS Rubber Division Spring meeting
 2014 - Melvin Mooney Distinguished Technology Award from the ACS Rubber Division

References 

1938 births
Polymer scientists and engineers
20th-century Japanese engineers
Living people
University of Akron people
Goodyear Tire and Rubber Company people‎ 
Bridgestone people